Donald Smith Airey (born 21 June 1948) is an English musician who has been the keyboardist in the rock band Deep Purple since 2002, after the retirement of Jon Lord. He has had a long and productive career, playing with such acts as Gary Moore, Ozzy Osbourne, Judas Priest, Black Sabbath, Jethro Tull, Whitesnake, Saxon, Wishbone Ash, Colosseum II, Ten, Sinner, Michael Schenker, Rainbow, Empire, Brian May, Divlje jagode and Living Loud. He has also worked with Andrew Lloyd Webber.

Early life
Inspired by his father, Norman Airey, Don Airey took a love for music at a young age and was trained in classical piano from the age of seven. He continued his love for music by earning a degree at the University of Nottingham and a diploma at the Royal Northern College of Music (where he studied under Ryszard Bakst). Following his studies, he formed a band and worked on P&O cruise liners travelling the world.

Career

1970s work
In 1971 he moved to London and joined Cozy Powell's band Hammer. In 1975 he joined Jon Hiseman's highly influential jazz rock band Colosseum II, along with Gary Moore, Neil Murray, Mike Starrs and later John Mole. They made three albums and also formed the core band for Andrew Lloyd Webber's album Variations, based on variations on a theme by Paganini. Don worked on several albums with solo artists and was a session musician on the 1978 Black Sabbath album Never Say Die!  Soon after, he joined guitarist Ritchie Blackmore's band, Rainbow, and featured on Gary Moore's solo debut Back on the Streets. With Rainbow he contributed to two hit albums, Down to Earth and Difficult to Cure.

1980s work
After leaving Rainbow in 1981, Airey joined with Ozzy Osbourne for a three-year stint where he helped with the albums Bark at the Moon and Speak of the Devil. He also played on the Diary of a Madman Tour from 1981 to 1982 and appears on Blizzard of Ozz and was also the only witness to Randy Rhoads's death. Airey joined Jethro Tull in 1987 for their tour in support of Crest of a Knave. The same year also saw the release of Whitesnake's multi-platinum Whitesnake, on which Airey played keyboards. Soon after he quit the band to record the solo album K2 – Tales of Triumph and Tragedy. In it he plays with Gary Moore and Keith Airey – guitars, Cozy Powell – drums, Laurence Cottle – bass, Chris (Hamlet) Thompson, Colin Blunstone, Mel Galley, and Genki Hitomi – vocals.

1990s onwards

In 1990, Airey recorded keyboard parts for several songs on Judas Priest's album Painkiller. However, because Judas Priest wanted the album to have a heavier sound than their previous work, only one song on Painkiller, "A Touch of Evil", prominently features Airey.  In a 2020 interview, Airey revealed that he also played most of the album's bass parts on a Minimoog, as Judas Priest bassist Ian Hill was unable to participate in recording sessions due to illness.

In 1997 he arranged and played on "Love Shine a Light" by Katrina and the Waves, conducting the accompanying orchestra at the Eurovision Song Contest. The song won the contest.

In 1999 he joined Manchester-based melodic hard rock band Ten where he played keyboards on the album Babylon, which was released in 2000. He also toured with the band in support of the new album.

Airey played keyboards on the song "Darkness Be My Friend" by Iron Maiden vocalist Bruce Dickinson, released on the 2002 reissue of Dickinson's debut solo album Tattooed Millionaire.  Airey also played keyboards on At Vance's mastermind Olaf Lenk's first solo album Sunset Cruise.  In 2006 Airey featured on Gary Moore's release Old New Ballads Blues contributing to all tracks.

In 2008 Airey released his second solo album, A Light in the Sky and recently it has been announced that another solo album from Airey is set to premiere in 2011.

In early 2014 Airey joined hard rock band Hollywood Monsters where he played keyboards (Hammond B3 organ) on the track "Move On" on the album "Big Trouble" which was released in 2014 on Mausoleum Records. The album features Steph Honde on vocals and guitars, Vinny Appice on drums, Tim Bogert on bass and Paul Di'Anno on lead vocals on the bonus track.

On 18 January 2017, Airey was inducted into the Hall of Heavy Metal History.

Deep Purple
Airey joined Deep Purple in 2001 to fill in for an injured Jon Lord, who subsequently retired from the band.  Airey joined the band as a full-time keyboardist in March 2002. He has recorded six studio albums with the band, Bananas, Rapture of the Deep, Now What?!, Infinite, Whoosh! and Turning to Crime.

Interviewed by Jeb Wright, for Classic Rock Revisited, about the album Now What?!, he said "Well, it's Deep Purple and there is a Hammond there.  There is only one way to go, really.  Over the years, I have really worked on my sound, it didn't just happen overnight.  The first two, or three, years I was with the band, I was using Jon's C3 and it was pretty knackered.  I had it refurbished. It's been put in mothballs now... I much prefer Hammond A-100's, that's my choice."

Instruments and gear
Airey has employed many instruments and effect processors to aid him in the creation of his music and is well known for the use of his Hammond A100. In an interview with Keyboard Magazine Don Airey explained that he preferred the Hammond A-100 over other organs (including the Hammond B-3) for their "purer tone" in live settings.  He also uses Leslie 122 speakers and a Hughes and Kettner Puretone amplifier. For piano sounds, Airey uses a Kurzweil PC3K8 and also uses a MOOG Voyager. He also uses several rack and pedal based units such as a Roland Fantom.

Airey is also an endorsing artist for several effects companies including Neunaber Audio and TC Electronic and currently uses a Neunaber Seraphim  Shimmer as well as a TC Hall of Fame Reverb and a TC Flashback Delay.

Personal life
Airey lives with his wife, Doris, and their three children in South West Cambridgeshire. In 1992, Airey's son suffered from a serious illness, causing him to slow down his musical activity until 1995. Airey is an ardent Sunderland A.F.C. fan.

He has a brother, Keith Airey, who played guitar for Nik Kershaw during the mid 1980s and the reformed version of The Zombies from 2001 to 2010 and is currently lead guitarist for the London stage show Mamma Mia!.

His other brother, Paul Airey, played piano for SlowBone and Rollups and currently works with Robbie Gladwell.

He is currently writing a book about his experiences in the music business.

Discography

Solo

As band member

As session member

Guest appearances 

 1976 – Babe Ruth – Kid's Stuff
 1978 – Jim Rafferty – Don't Talk Back
 1979 – Bernie Marsden – And About Time Too
 1985 – Alaska – The Pack
 1985 – Phenomena – Phenomena
 1985 – Gary Moore & Phil Lynott – "Out in the Fields"
 1986 – Zeno – Zeno
 1987 – Wild Strawberries – Wild Strawberries
 1987 – Helix – Wild in the Streets
 1988 – Fastway – Bad Bad Girls
 1988 – Jethro Tull – 20 Years of Jethro Tull
 1989 – Crossbones – Crossbones
 1990 – Perfect Crime – Blond on Blonde
 1990 – Jagged Edge – You Don't Love Me
 1990 – Bruce Dickinson – Tattooed Millionaire
 1990 – Forcefield – IV – Let the Wild Run Free
 1990 – Tigertailz – Bezerk
 1992 – Anthem – Domestic Booty
 1992 – Kaizoku – Kaizoku
 1993 – Brian May – Back to the Light
 1994 – Graham Bonnet – Here Comes the Night
 1994 – The Kick – Tough Trip Thru Paradise
 1994 – Katrina and the Waves – Turnaround
 1998 – Colin Blunstone – The Light
 1998 – The Cage – The Cage
 1998 – Olaf Lenk – Sunset Cruise
 1998 – Eddie Hardin – Wind in the Willows (live)
 1999 – Millennium – Millennium
 2000 – Micky Moody – I Eat Them for Breakfast
 2000 – Silver – Silver
 2000 – Olaf Lenk's F.O.O.D. – Fun Stuff
 2001 – Silver – Dream Machines
 2001 – Rolf Munkes' Empire – Hypnotica
 2002 – Metalium – Hero Nation – Chapter Three
 2002 – Bernie Marsden – Big Boy Blue
 2002 – Rolf Munkes' Empire – Trading Souls
 2003 – Silver – Intruder
 2005 – Kimberley Rew – Essex Hideaway
 2006 – Gwyn Ashton – Prohibition
 2009 – Carl Sentance – Mind Doctor
 2011 – Wishbone Ash – Elegant Stealth
 2012 – Persian Risk – Once a King
 2012 – Various artists – Help! For Japan
 2013 – Schubert – In Rock
 2014 - Hollywood Monsters - Big Trouble
 2014 - AraPacis - A Disturbing Awakening
 2021 - Metalium - Never Surrender

References

Further reading

External links

Don Airey Interview NAMM Oral History Library (2014)

1948 births
Living people
People educated at Bede Grammar School for Boys
People from Sunderland
Musicians from Tyne and Wear
English rock keyboardists
English heavy metal keyboardists
Deep Purple members
Eurovision Song Contest conductors
The Ozzy Osbourne Band members
Rainbow (rock band) members
The Gary Moore Band members
Anthem (band) members
Alumni of the University of Nottingham
Strawbs members
Michael Schenker Group members
Colosseum (band) members
21st-century conductors (music)
Living Loud members
Quatermass (band) members
Ten (band) members
The Company of Snakes members
Empire (German band) members
Fastway (band) members
Blues rock musicians